Easy Does It is a 2019 American adventure crime comedy film directed by Will Addison and starring Bryan Batt, Dwight Henry and Linda Hamilton.  It is Addison's feature directorial debut. The film premiered at the 2019 New Orleans Film Festival.

Cast
 Bryan Batt as Officer Owens
 Dwight Henry as Chief Parker
 Linda Hamilton as King George
 Ben Matheny as Jack Buckner
 Matthew Paul Martinez as Scottie Aldo
 Cory Dumesnil as Colin Hornsby
 Susan Gordan as Blues Eyes
 John Goodman as "Catfish" Crawford (voice)
 Harry Shearer as "Breezy" Bob McKee (voice)

Production
Filming occurred in Louisiana in July 2017.

Release
The film was released on VOD and digital platforms on July 17, 2020.

Reception
The film has  rating on Rotten Tomatoes.  Josiah Teal of Film Threat gave the film a 7.5 out of 10.

References

External links
 
 

American adventure films
American crime films
American comedy films
2019 films
2019 crime films
2019 comedy films
Films shot in Louisiana
2010s English-language films
2010s American films
2019 directorial debut films